Gregory Dale Bear (August 20, 1951 – November 19, 2022) was an American writer and illustrator best known for science fiction. His work covered themes of galactic conflict (Forge of God books), parallel universes (The Way series), consciousness and cultural practices (Queen of Angels), and accelerated evolution (Blood Music, Darwin's Radio, and Darwin's Children). His most recent work was the 2021 novel The Unfinished Land. Greg Bear wrote over 50 books in total.

Early life
Greg Bear was born in San Diego, California. He attended San Diego State University (1968–1973), where he received a Bachelor of Arts degree. At the university, he was a teaching assistant to Elizabeth Chater in her course on science fiction writing, and in later years her friend.

Career
Bear is often classified as a hard science fiction author because of the level of scientific detail in his work. Early in his career, he also published work as an artist, including illustrations for an early version of the reference  book Star Trek Concordance and covers for periodicals Galaxy and F&SF. He sold his first story, "Destroyers", to Famous Science Fiction in 1967.

In his fiction, Bear often addresses major questions in contemporary science and culture and proposes solutions. For example, The Forge of God offers an explanation for the Fermi paradox, supposing that the galaxy is filled with potentially predatory intelligences and that young civilizations that survive are those that do not attract their attention but stay quiet. In Queen of Angels, Bear examines crime, guilt, and punishment in society. He frames these questions around an examination of consciousness and awareness, including the emergent self-awareness of highly advanced computers in communication with humans. In Darwin's Radio and Darwin's Children, he addresses the problem of overpopulation with a mutation in the human genome making, basically, a new series of humans. The question of cultural acceptance of something new and unavoidable is also indicated.

One of Bear's favorite themes is reality as a function of observation. In Blood Music, reality becomes unstable as the number of observers (trillions of intelligent single-cell organisms) spirals higher and higher. Anvil of Stars (sequel to The Forge of God) and Moving Mars postulate a physics based on information exchange between particles, capable of being altered at the "bit level." In Moving Mars, that knowledge is used to remove Mars from the Solar System and transfer it to an orbit around a distant star.

Blood Music was first published as a short story (1983) and then expanded to a novel (1985). It has also been credited as the first account of nanotechnology in science fiction. More certainly, the short story is the first in science fiction to describe microscopic medical machines and to treat DNA as a computational system capable of being reprogrammed, that is, expanded and modified. In later works, beginning with Queen of Angels and continuing with its sequel, Slant, Bear gives a detailed description of a near-future nanotechnological society. This historical sequence continues with Heads—which may contain the first description of a so-called "quantum logic computer"—and with Moving Mars. The sequence also charts the historical development of self-awareness in artificial intelligence. Its continuing character Jill was inspired in part by Robert A. Heinlein's self-aware computer Mycroft HOLMES in The Moon Is a Harsh Mistress (1966).

Bear, Gregory Benford, and David Brin wrote a trilogy of prequel novels to Isaac Asimov's influential Foundation trilogy. Bear is credited with the middle book.

While most of Bear's work is science fiction, he has written in other fiction genres. Examples include Songs of Earth and Power (fantasy) and Psychlone (horror). Bear has described his Dead Lines, which straddles the line between science fiction and fantasy, as a "high-tech ghost story". He has received many accolades, including five Nebula Awards and two Hugo Awards.

Bear cited Ray Bradbury as the most influential writer in his life. He met Bradbury in 1967 and had a lifelong correspondence. As a teenager, Bear attended Bradbury lectures and events in Southern California.

He also served on the Board of Advisors for the Museum of Science Fiction. Bear was also one of the five co-founders of the San Diego Comic-Con.

Personal life and death
In 1975, Bear married Christina M. Nielson; they divorced in 1981. In 1983, he married Astrid Anderson, the daughter of the science fiction and fantasy authors Poul and Karen Anderson. They had two children, Chloe and Alexandra, and resided near Seattle, Washington.

Bear died on November 19, 2022, at the age of 71, from  multiple strokes, caused by clots that had been hiding in a false lumen of the anterior artery to the brain since a surgery in 2014. After being on life support for two days and not expected to recover, per his advance healthcare directive life support was withdrawn.

Awards and accolades
 The story on which the novel Blood Music was based, published in the June 1983 issue of Analog, won the Best Novelette Nebula Award (1983) and Hugo Award (1984).
 "Tangents" won both the Hugo Award for Best Short Story and the Nebula Award for Best Short Story
 Darwin's Radio won the Endeavour Award in 2000.
 Hull Zero Three was short-listed for the Arthur C. Clarke (Book) Award in 2012.
 Hayakawa Award "Heads" Best Foreign Short Story (1996).
 Inkpot Award (1984)
 Doris Lessing, winner of the 2007 Nobel Prize in literature, wrote, "I also admire the classic sort of science fiction, like Blood Music, by Greg Bear. He's a great writer."

Bibliography

Novels

Series
Darwin
 Darwin's Radio (1999) Nebula Award winner, Hugo, Locus SF, and John W. Campbell Memorial Awards nominee, 2000
 Darwin's Children (2003) Locus SF, Arthur C. Clarke, and John W. Campbell Memorial Awards nominee, 2004

The Forge of God
 The Forge of God (1987) Hugo, and Locus SF Awards nominee, 1988; Nebula Award nominee, 1986
 Anvil of Stars (1992)

Songs of Earth and Power
 The Infinity Concerto (1984) Locus Fantasy Award nominee, 1985
 The Serpent Mage (1986)
 Songs of Earth and Power (1994 – combines The Infinity Concerto and The Serpent Mage)

Quantico
 Quantico (2005)
 Mariposa (2009)

Quantum Logic
Novels in internal chronology:
 Queen of Angels (1990) Hugo, Locus, and John W. Campbell Memorial Awards nominee, 1991
 Slant (1997) John W. Campbell Memorial Award nominee, 1998
 Heads (1990)
 Moving Mars (1993) Nebula Award winner; Hugo, Locus SF, and John W. Campbell Memorial Awards nominee, 1994

War dogs
 
 Killing Titan (2015)
 Take Back the Sky (2016)

The Way
 Eon (1985) Arthur C. Clarke Award nominee, 1987
 Eternity (1988)
 Legacy (1995) Locus SF Award nominee, 1996
 The Way of All Ghosts (1999)

Series (non-originating author)
The Foundation Series
 Foundation and Chaos (1998) (Second Foundation series: book 2)

Man-Kzin Wars
 The Man Who Would Be Kzin (with S.M. Stirling) (1991)

Halo
The Forerunner Saga (trilogy)
 Halo: Cryptum (2011) (Forerunner trilogy book 1)
 Halo: Primordium (2012) (Forerunner trilogy book 2)
 Halo: Silentium (2013) (Forerunner trilogy book 3) 

Star Trek: The Original Series
 Corona (1984)

Star Wars
 Rogue Planet (2000)

Foreworld Saga
The Mongoliad (2012–2013)

Non-series
 Hegira (1979)
 Psychlone (1979)
 Beyond Heaven's River (1980)
 Strength of Stones (1981)
 Blood Music (1985) Hugo, and John W. Campbell Memorial Awards nominee, 1986; British Science Fiction Award nominee, 1986; Nebula Award nominee, 1985
 Dinosaur Summer (1998) (winner 1999 Endeavour Award)
 Vitals (2002) John W. Campbell Memorial Award nominee 2003
 Dead Lines (2004)
 City at the End of Time (Gollancz edition published July 17, 2008; Del Rey Books edition August 2008) (Nominated for the Locus and Campbell Awards, 2009)
 Hull Zero Three (2010)
 The Unfinished Land (2021)

Short fiction
 Hardfought (1983)
Collections
 The Wind from a Burning Woman (1983, vt The Venging 1992)
 Early Harvest (February 1988)
 Tangents (1989)
 Bear's Fantasies (1992)
 The Collected Stories of Greg Bear (2002)
 W3: Women in Deep Time (2003)
 Sleepside: The Collected Fantasies (November 2005)

Anthologies edited
 New Legends (1995, with Martin H. Greenberg)
 Multiverse: Exploring Poul Anderson's Worlds (2014, with Gardner Dozois)
 Nebula Awards Showcase 2015 (2015)

Critical studies and reviews of Bear's work
 War dogs

Explanatory notes

References

External links

 
 2010 Interview on the Geek's Guide to the Galaxy Podcast
 Interview with Greg Bear, By Dag R., February 1, 2000, at 
 All of Greg Bear's audio interviews on the podcast The Future And You (in which he describes his expectations of the future)
 
 
 The 20th challenge of the society of digital artists, which made use of EON. In the about part it includes the chapters 1, 2, 10 and 33.
 Complete list of sci-fi award wins and nominations by novel
 Interview with questions submitted by Reddit.com users
 Greg Bear on Worlds Without End
 
 

1951 births
2022 deaths
20th-century American male writers
20th-century American novelists
20th-century American short story writers
21st-century American male writers
21st-century American novelists
21st-century American short story writers
American alternate history writers
American fantasy writers
American horror writers
American illustrators
American male novelists
American male short story writers
American science fiction writers
American transhumanists
Anthologists
Endeavour Award winners
Futurologists
Hugo Award-winning writers
Inkpot Award winners
Nebula Award winners
Novelists from Washington (state)
San Diego State University alumni
Writers from San Diego
Writers from Seattle